Witch's Hat may refer to

 Witch hat, in popular culture
 Pointed hat, in general 
 Hygrocybe conica, a fungus commonly known as the "witch's hat"
 Prospect Park Water Tower, sometimes referred to as the "Witch's Hat"
 Traffic cone, known as a "witch's hat" in some countries

See also
 Witch Hats, a rock band